The Safran EngineUS is a family of electric motors for aircraft propulsion developed by Safran, outputting up to .

Design 

The EngineUS 45 motor produce  maximum and  continuously, has a power-to-weight ratio of 2.5 kW/kg at 2,500 rpm and an efficiency over 94%.

Applications 
 SOCATA TBM-based EcoPulse: distributed hybrid-electric propulsion demonstrator, planned to fly in 2022; six EngineUS-driven propellers integrated into the wing.
 VoltAero Cassio: modified Cessna 337 Skymaster with two tractor EngineUS 45 on the wing, planned to fly in November 2019.

See also 
 MagniX
 Siemens SP90G
 Siemens SP260D

References 

Aircraft electric engines